The Negros Occidental Multi-Purpose Activity Center (NOMPAC) is a provincial-owned multi-use gym located in Bacolod, adjacent to the Capitol Lagoon, in Negros Occidental, Philippines. It is currently used mostly for basketball, karatedo and boxing matches.

Aside from the gym, it also serves as evacuation site of the province during calamities likewise also serves as cultural facilities in many events and other government related activities like seminars, business and political gatherings.

See also
Bacolod
Negros Occidental
BAYS Center
La Salle Coliseum
Bacolod City Arena

References

External links
Official Website of the Provincial Government of Negros Occidental

Athletics (track and field) venues in the Philippines
Indoor arenas in the Philippines
Buildings and structures in Bacolod
Sports in Negros Occidental